Route 8 is a  state highway in the eastern part of the U.S. state of Missouri. It travels from Interstate 44 (I-44) in St. James to U.S. Route 67 (US 67) and US 67 Business in Desloge. It acts as a bypass, from I-44 in St. James, to US 67 in Desloge. Travelers on I-44 can use it to avoid the traffic problems in St. Louis, to US 67 in Desloge, & vice versa. Those who want to go to Ste. Genevieve can take US 67 Bus. through Park Hills to US 67, to Farmington, then take Route 32 to Ste. Genevieve. There have supposedly been plans to extend Route 8 to Ste. Genevieve. So far, those plans have not been put into effect.

Between Steelville and Potosi, Route 8 was initially Route 62 from 1922 to 1926. The route was renumbered because US 60 had been planned as US 62.

Route description
Route 8 begins its run in St. James concurrent with Route 68 just south of the interchange with I-44. The two routes are concurrent for approximately 4 miles before Route 68 splits from Route 8 and heads southeast to Salem while Route 8 runs east to Steelville, passing Maramec Spring Park in the process. Route 8 is concurrent with Route 19 through Steelville; the two routes split on the eastern side of town at which point Route 8 runs east through one ranger district of the Mark Twain National Forest on its way to Potosi. About 15 miles east of Potosi, it reaches Business Loop 67 in Desloge and runs concurrently with that route until their termination at the interchange with U.S. Route 67.

History

Major intersections

See also

References

External links

008
Transportation in Phelps County, Missouri
Transportation in Crawford County, Missouri
Transportation in Washington County, Missouri
Transportation in St. Francois County, Missouri